Thomas Jefferson School of Law (TJSL) is a private law school in San Diego, California. It offers a Juris Doctor and three Master of Laws programs, including one that is exclusively online, as well as a combined J.D./M.B.A. with San Diego State University.

The school is not accredited by the American Bar Association (ABA), following the ABA's withdrawal of approval in December 2019. However, it is approved by the California State Bar’s Committee of Bar Examiners.  As a result, graduates since 2019 are generally not able to take the bar or practice law outside of California.

History 

The Thomas Jefferson School of Law was founded in 1969 as the San Diego campus of the Western State University College of Law and operated as such until 1995, when it became independent. It joined the Association of American Law Schools in 2008. In January 2011, TJSL moved to a new,  building located in the East Village district of downtown San Diego. In 2018, the school announced it would vacate its building as a cost-cutting measure, moving into an office building in downtown San Diego.

Accreditation 

TJSL received accreditation from the American Bar Association (ABA) in 1996. The ABA revoked the school's accreditation on June 10, 2019. This followed a public censure by the ABA in 2018 and a 2017 decision to place the school on probation for being out of compliance with the ABA requirement that schools admit only students who appear capable of earning a J.D. degree and passing the bar examination. In October 2018, TJSL became a California state approved school, allowing its students to take the California Bar Exam.

Academics 

The program offers Master of Laws (LL.M.), Master of Science of Law (M.S.L) and JSD "Doctor of Laws or Juridical Science" degrees. Certificate Programs in International Financial Centers, United States Taxation, E-commerce, Anti-Money Laundering & Compliance, and Trusts and Estate Planning are available. Faculty for the program are generally part-time and populated with industry professionals. Students begin classes in August, attend the three-year, full-time program or the four-year, part-time program, and can accelerate graduation one semester by taking additional classes during the summer. Day and evening classes are offered.

Bar pass rate

Bar pass rates 

The October 2020 California Bar pass rate for TJSL graduates was 47% for first time takers and 44% for repeat takers, vs. statewide averages of 74% and 43%, respectively.

Costs and student debt 

The total cost of attendance (indicating the cost of tuition, fees, and living expenses) at the Thomas Jefferson School of Law for the 2018–2019 academic year is $77,660. Law School Transparency estimated debt-financed cost of attendance for three years at $297,652.

According to U.S. News & World Report, the average indebtedness of 2018 graduates who incurred law school debt was $196,607 (not including undergraduate debt), and 92% of 2018 graduates took on debt. The average indebtedness of graduates who incurred law school debt is second-highest among US law schools.  The school's Associate Dean for Student Affairs has attributed the average debt level to the school's admittance of immigrants and those who are the first in their family to attend law school—people who are statistically more likely to lack individual or family resources.

Post-graduation employment 

According to Thomas Jefferson School of Law's official 2018 ABA-required disclosures, 19% of the Class of 2018 obtained full-time, long-term, JD-required employment nine months after graduation.

In 2013, the National Law Journal reported the college has the worst unemployment rate after graduation (31.5%) amongst all law schools in the country.

In January 2011, a New York Times article about the inability of many recent law school graduates to get jobs discussed Thomas Jefferson's claim that 92% of the class of 2009 was employed within nine months of graduation. The school's claim was based on a survey of the class of 2009. (Under ABA rules, 25% of graduates who do not participate in employment surveys are counted as employed.). The Wall Street Journal also ran a story in June 2012 listing TJSL as one of the 'bottom five' schools for 2011 graduate employment.

In May 2011, Anna Alaburda filed a class-action lawsuit against her alma mater, alleging that the law school had committed fraud by publishing deceptive post-graduation employment statistics and salary data in order to bait new students into enrolling. Alaburda, a 2008 honors graduate, claimed that despite having graduated at the top of her class and passed the California bar exam, she was unable to find suitable legal employment, and had racked up more than $150,000 in student loan debt. This is the first time a law school would stand trial for allegedly inflating its employment statistics. The jury found in favor of TJSL with a 9–3 verdict.

Center for Solo Practitioners 

Since Fall 2012, TJSL has operated a lawyer incubator program called the Center for Solo Practitioners. The incubator provides space and support for selected alumni who are going into solo practice. It is also intended to help serve under-represented communities.

At the 2013 annual meeting of the American Bar Association, the Center for Solo Practitioners was honored with an ABA award in recognition of "successful implementation of a project or program specifically targeted to solo and small-firm lawyers."

Additional programs offered

Intellectual property 

In 2009, TJSL initiated an Intellectual Property Fellowship Program for students with undergraduate or advanced degrees in the hard sciences or engineering. The TJSL Center for Law and Intellectual Property has course offerings in copyright, patent, trademark and unfair competition law as well as cyberspace law, biotechnology law and bioethics, telecommunications and media law, and sports and entertainment law.

International law 

The Center for Global Legal Studies offers a specialized program in international law.

Social Justice Center 

The Center for Law and Social Justice is a research and teaching program in areas of public policy and law in its field.

Notable people

Alumni 

 Roger Benitez 1978—Federal Judge of the U.S. District Court of the Southern District of California
 Bonnie Dumanis 1976—First openly gay or lesbian DA in the country. Also the first Jewish woman DA in San Diego
 Michael Dvorak 1975- Former Indiana State Representative and St. Joseph County, Indiana Prosecutor
 Duncan Hunter 1976—Republican member of the House of Representatives from California's 52nd, 45th and 42nd districts from 1981 to 2009 and 2008 presidential candidate
 Jessica King 2001—Wisconsin professor and former Wisconsin state senator
 Leslie Alexander—A former stock trader and former owner of the National Basketball Association (NBA) team Houston Rockets.
 Tim Purpura 1992—Former general manager of the Houston Astros
 Sherrexcia "Rexy" Rolle 2014-Bahamian attorney, singer and VP of Operations & General Counsel of Western Air

Faculty 

 Marjorie Cohn—Former president of the National Lawyers Guild and book author

See also 

 Law school rankings in the United States
 List of law school GPA curves

References

External links 

 

 
San Diego
1969 establishments in California
Independent law schools in the United States